Salix vulpina is a species of willow native to Hokkaido and the southern Kuril Islands. It is a deciduous shrub, reaching a height of 2 m.

References 

vulpina